Osteolepididae is an family of primitive, fish-like tetrapodomorphs (the clade that contains modern tetrapods and their extinct relatives) that lived during the Devonian period. The family is generally thought to be paraphyletic, with the traits that characterise the family being widely distributed among basal tetrapodomorphs and other osteichthyans. Some of genera historically placed in Osteolepididae have more recently been assigned to the family Megalichthyidae, which appears to be a monophyletic group.

Genera 
Below is a list of genera regarded as osteolepidids at some point:

 Chrysolepis 
 Ectosteorhachis 
 Geptolepis
 Glyptopomus
 Gogonasus
 Greiserolepis
 Gyroptychius
 "Diplopterus" 
 Kenichthys
 Latvius
 Medoevia 
 Megalichthys 
 Megapomus
 Megistolepis
 Muranjilepis
 Osteolepis
 Peregrina
 Shirolepis
 Thursius

References 

Tetrapodomorphs
Devonian bony fish
Prehistoric lobe-finned fish families
Devonian first appearances
Devonian extinctions
Paraphyletic groups
Taxa named by Edward Drinker Cope